The Abbot of Holyrood (later Commendator of Holyrood) was the head of the Augustinian monastic community of Holyrood Abbey, now in Edinburgh. The long history of the abbey came to a formal end in July 1606 when the parliament of Scotland turned the abbey into a secular lordship for the last commendator, John Bothwell (confirmed by charter in December 1607). The following is a list of abbots and commendators:

List of abbots

 Alwin, 1128-1151
 Osbert, 1151
 William (I), 1152-1172
 John, 1173-1178x1184
 William (II), 1187x1189-1206
 Walter, 1210-1217 or 1218
 William (III), 1217 x 1218-1221
 William (IV) son of "Owin", 1221-1227
 Gilbert, 1236
 Elias son of Nicholas, 1227-1236 x 1253
 Henry, 1236 x 1253-1255
 Radulf, 1253x1256-1258
 Robert, 1273 x1279
 William de Haddington, 1285
 Adam, 1291-1299
 Elias, 1309-1320 or 1321
 Simon de Wedale, 1321-1327
 John de Cambusnethan, 1328-1339
 Bartholomew, 1342
 Thomas de St Andrews, ?1347-1370
 John, 1370-1378
 David Bell, 1379-1386
 John de Leith, 1386-71415x1420
 Henry de Dryden, 1420-1423
 Walter Bower, 1420
 Patrick Witherspoon (Wotherspoon), 1423-1445
 William, 1425
 James Cameron, 1446-1450
 Archibald Crawford, 1450-1484
 Robert Ballantyne, 1484-1500
 James Stewart, 1498-1500
 George Crichton, 1500-1526
 William Douglas, 1526-1528
 Robert Cairncross, 1528-1538
 David Douglas, 1530-1531

List of commendators

 Robert Stewart, 1539-1568
 Adam Bothwell, 1568-1582
 John Bothwell, 1582-1606

Notes

Bibliography
 Cowan, Ian B. & Easson, David E., Medieval Religious Houses: Scotland With an Appendix on the Houses in the Isle of Man, Second Edition, (London, 1976), pp. 90–1
 Watt, D.E.R. & Shead, N.F. (eds.), The Heads of Religious Houses in Scotland from the 12th to the 16th Centuries, The Scottish Records Society, New Series, Volume 24, (Edinburgh, 2001), pp. 92–6

See also
 Holyrood Abbey

Canonical Augustinian abbots and priors
Scottish abbots
Lists of abbots
Lists of Scottish people